Más futuro que pasado (English: More future than past) is the eighth studio album by Colombian recording artist Juanes, released on November 22, 2019. The album features a fusion of pop rock and Latin American folk music, along with reggaetón and rap sounds. The album features contributions from Sebastián Yatra, Lalo Ebratt, Christian Nodal, Alessia Cara, Crudo Means Raw, and Fuego.
 
"Pa' Dentro" was the first single released on May 31, 2018, followed by "La Plata", "Querer Mejor", and "Bonita". Juanes told Billboard, "I took a journey through cumbia, vallenato, and guasca (traditional folk music from Antioquia) with my authentic base, elements of electric guitar, reggae, rock. I gave myself the opportunity to work with new artists that come from totally different genres and was able to create something new. I've very happy. I feel that it's a feel-good album, very bright."

Reception

Thom Jurek of AllMusic called the album a "hooky, rhythm-heavy study in why Juanes remains a prime mover in the mercurial world of Latin popular music". He added that "two decades into his career, Juanes remains a musical seeker; he carefully integrates what attracts him into his own trademark style, creating a sound at once instantly recognizable and bracingly future forward." Suzy Exposito of Rolling Stone wrote that Más futuro que pasado "is a soulful celebration of the Latin folk tradition as well as Juanes' very first love: the guitar".

Track listing

Charts

Weekly charts

Year-end charts

Certifications

References

2020 albums
Juanes albums
Spanish-language albums
Universal Music Latino albums